Luminism is an American landscape painting style of the 1850s to 1870s, characterized by effects of light in landscape, through the use of aerial perspective and the concealment of visible brushstrokes. Luminist landscapes emphasize tranquility, and often depict calm, reflective water and a soft, hazy sky. Artists who were most central to the development of the luminist style include Fitz Hugh Lane, Martin Johnson Heade, Sanford Gifford, and John F. Kensett. Painters with a less clear affiliation include Frederic Edwin Church, Jasper Cropsey, Albert Bierstadt, Worthington Whittredge, Raymond Dabb Yelland, Alfred Thompson Bricher, James Augustus Suydam, and David Johnson. Some precursor artists are George Harvey and Robert Salmon.

History

The term luminism was introduced by mid-20th-century art historians to describe a 19th-century American painting style that developed as an offshoot of the Hudson River School. The historian John I. H. Baur established an outline of the style in the late 1940s, and he first used the term "luminism" in a 1954 article. The National Gallery of Art's landmark 1980 exhibition American Light: The Luminist Movement, 1825-1875 centered many artists now primarily associated with the Hudson River School, such as Frederic Edwin Church.

As defined by art historian Barbara Novak, luminist artworks tend to stress the horizontal, and demonstrate the artist's close control of structure, tone, and light. The light is generally cool, hard, and non-diffuse; "soft, atmospheric, painterly light is not luminist light". Brushstrokes are concealed in such a way that the painter's personality is minimized. Luminist paintings tend not to be large so as to maintain a sense of timeless intimacy. The picture surface or plane is emphasized in a manner sometimes seen in primitivism. These qualities are present in different amounts depending on the artist, and within a work. Novak states that luminism, of all American art, is most closely associated with transcendentalism. The definitional difficulties have contributed to over-use of the term.

Luminism shares an emphasis on the effects of light with Impressionism. However, the two styles are markedly different. Luminism is characterized by attention to detail and the hiding of brushstrokes, while impressionism is characterized by lack of detail and an emphasis on brushstrokes. Luminism preceded impressionism, and the artists who painted in a luminist style were in no way influenced by Impressionism.

Luminism has also been considered to represent a contemplative perception of nature. According to Earl E. Powell, this would be particularly visible in paintings by John Frederick Kensett, who shifted the visual concern for landscape to an interest in quietism, making pictures of mood that depict a poetic experience of nature. Furthermore, his painting Shrewsbury River would "reduce nature to cryptographic essentials of composition...while rarified veils of light, color, and atmosphere reflected in water offer an experience of silence", a description akin to the sublime. Similarly, Martin Johnson Heade's painting Thunder Storm on Narragansett Bay would represent the greatness of nature and a feeling of the sublime arising from an intimate engagement with nature.

The artists who painted in this style did not refer to their own work as "luminism", nor did they articulate any common aesthetic philosophy outside of the guiding principles of the Hudson River School. Many art historians find the term "luminism" problematic. J. Gray Sweeney argues that "the origins of luminism as an art-historical term were deeply entwined with the interests of elite collectors, prominent art dealers, influential curators, art historians, and constructions of national identity during the Cold War." Building on Sweeney's work, Alan Wallach has called for a wholesale rethinking of "luminism" as a historical phenomenon.

Contemporary luminism

Ingredients of luminism – such as majestic skies, calm waters, rarefied light, and other representations of magnificence – have been also appreciated in contemporary American painting. Such a trend is visible in artists like James Doolin, April Gornik. and Steven DaLuz. The term neoluminism has been suggested in reference to contemporary American luminism.

A distilled influence of luminism can be seen in the works of several American experimental filmmakers including James Benning and Sharon Lockhart, particularly in Benning's Ten Skies (2004) and Lockhart's Double Tide (2009).

Notes

References
 Luminism article in ArtLex Art Dictionary

External links

American Paintings in The Metropolitan Museum of Art, a fully digitized 3 volume exhibition catalog
Hudson River school visions: the landscapes of Sanford R. Gifford, an exhibition catalog from The Metropolitan Museum of Art (fully available online as PDF), which contains much on Luminism

 
American art movements
 Luminism
Hudson River School
Transcendentalism